The 2021–22 Grambling State Tigers men's basketball team represented Grambling State University in the 2021–22 NCAA Division I men's basketball season. The Tigers, led by fifth-year head coach Donte Jackson, played their home games at the Fredrick C. Hobdy Assembly Center in Grambling, Louisiana as members of the Southwestern Athletic Conference.

Previous season
The Tigers finished the 2020–21 season 11–11, 9–6 in SWAC play to finish in fourth place. In the SWAC tournament, they defeated Southern in the quarterfinals, before falling to top-seeded Prairie View A&M in the semifinals.

Roster

Schedule and results

|-
!colspan=12 style=| Non-conference regular season

|-
!colspan=12 style=| SWAC regular season

|-
!colspan=9 style=| SWAC tournament

Sources

References

Grambling State Tigers men's basketball seasons
Grambling State Tigers
Grambling State Tigers men's basketball
Grambling State Tigers men's basketball